Dishwasher most commonly refers to a home appliance which automatically washes dishes.

Dishwasher may also refer to:

 Dishwasher (occupation), a person who washes dishes as an occupation
 Scullery maid, a traditional occupation in which a woman washed dishes in a scullery before the invention of automatic dishwashers
 The Dishwasher game series for Xbox 360, including 2009's The Dishwasher: Dead Samurai and 2011's The Dishwasher: Vampire Smile
 Dishwasher Pete or Pete Jordan, author of the Dishwasher zine and book

See also
 Dishwashing